Dynamite MC (born Dominic Smith, 7 October 1973) is an English rapper and MC.  He originally gained prominence in jungle/drum and bass, working with Roni Size & Reprazent, but has also released hip hop material.

Career
He started his MCing career on pirate radio station Crush FM, broadcasting in Gloucester, South West England during the early 1990s. He met Roni Size in 1994 and began MCing for the Full Cycle crew. When the Bristol collective formed the live band Reprazent, Dynamite shared vocal duties with singer, Onallee. Their debut album New Forms won the Mercury Music Prize in 1997. Dynamite's role was enhanced for Reprazent's second album, the hip-hop influenced In the Mode (2000).

Solo work
Following this, Dynamite collaborated with a range of artists including The Nextmen, High Contrast, Caspa, Netsky, DJ Skitz, Scratch Perverts, Andy C and DJ Zinc, releasing a solo album The World of Dynamite (2004). In 2006, a remix CD, Big Man Talk was released on the Strong Records label (featuring samples from Enya and Kanye West). A third album, Styles Galore was set to follow in 2006.

Other works
Dynamite MC hosts a two-hour 'Smooth Grooves' show on Kiss 100 every Monday night at 9:00pm (GMT), as well as hosting the Fresh 40 R&B and dance chart across some of the UK's commercial radio stations on Sunday afternoons.

The track "Bounce" is featured on the soundtrack of Madden NFL '07. "Bounce" and "After Party" also feature in the video game, Need for Speed: Carbon. He recently worked with Camo & Krooked for their song "Stand Up" (Camo & Krooked vs Friction feat. Dynamite MC), with Netsky on a track titled "The Whistle Song" for Netsky's album, 2, and with Dyro on "Against All Odds".

Discography

Albums
The World of Dynamite (2004)
Big Man Talk Mixtape (2006)
Big Man Talk 2 (2009)
Big Man Talk 3 (2011)

Singles
"Switch" (1994)
"After Party" (1998)
"Hey DJ" (Kamanchi feat. Dynamite MC) (2002) – UK No. 85
"Hotness" (2003) – UK No. 66
"Ride" (2004) – UK No. 54
"No More" – UK No. 26
"Bounce"
"What!" (2008)
"Here We Go" (DJ Fumiya feat. Dynamite MC) (2010)
"Kawaii" (feat. Missill, Aluna Francis and Rye Rye) (2011)
"Prototype" (2018)

References

External links
 Official Dynamite MC Myspace
 Strong Records website
 Discography at rolldabeats.com
 Discography at Discogs

1973 births
English drum and bass musicians
Black British male rappers
Musicians from Bristol
Living people